The 1935–36 NCAA football bowl games were the final games of the 1935 college football season, and included the debut of the Sun Bowl being played with collegiate teams, which complemented the Orange, Rose, and Sugar Bowl as the fourth post-season game. Both Southeastern Conference (SEC) teams, LSU and Ole Miss, suffered single-point defeats.

What may be striking about these bowl games, from a historical perspective, is three of the eight participating teams. , two of the teams—the Catholic University Cardinals and Hardin–Simmons Cowboys—compete in the NCAA's lowest level of competition, Division III. Another team, the New Mexico State Aggies, still compete at the highest level but they have one of the lowest winning percentages in the Football Bowl Subdivision.

Poll rankings
No AP Poll for college football was taken this season; it would not become a regular occurrence until the 1936 season. Contemporary polls named different national champions; the Dickinson System chose SMU, while the Dunkel System selected Princeton.

Bowl schedule

References